Bound & Gagged magazine was published by the Outbound Press from 1987 to 2005. The magazine was dedicated to the interests of gay bondage and discipline practitioners and provided articles about actual encounters, fictional encounters, techniques, fantasies and images of bound and gagged men. It was headquartered in New York City.

According to Bob Wingate, owner of the Outbound Press, publisher and editor of Bound & Gagged, "When Bound & Gagged first appeared on the scene, there was virtually nothing else out there. Drummer published bondage stories and photos from time to time, but there was nothing devoted to bondage in all its varied manifestations, from average guys simply cuffing and rope tying each other for fun, to whole ritualistic life-styles in leather and latex, making use of the most elegant and expensive restrictive devices—not to mention everything in between."

A complete set of Bound & Gagged is preserved at the Leather Archives and Museum, as are the 25-box collection of papers of Robert W. Davolt, the editor of Bound & Gagged. In 2017 Davolt was honored along with other notables, named on bronze bootprints, as part of San Francisco South of Market Leather History Alley.

Suspension of operations
Bound & Gagged was first published in November 1987. The founder was Bob Wingate. The magazine suspended publication immediately after issue #106 in June 2005 following the death of Robert W. Davolt, the magazine's editor.

References

External links
 Bob Wingate's Blog Online

LGBT-related magazines published in the United States
Pornographic magazines published in the United States
Bondage pornography
Bondage magazines
Defunct magazines published in the United States
Gay male BDSM
Gay male pornography in the United States
Gay male pornographic magazines
Leather subculture
Magazines established in 1987
Magazines disestablished in 2005
Magazines published in New York City
1987 establishments in New York City
2005 disestablishments in New York (state)
BDSM literature